Wardböhmen is a village administered by the Lower Saxon town of Bergen in the northern part of Celle district on the Lüneburg Heath in North Germany.

History 
Wardböhmen was first mentioned in the records in 1197 as Villa Werthebohmen. Its purview includes the villages of Hoope and Sehlhof. Since the district reforms of 1974 Wardböhmen has been part of the borough of Bergen. Its current chair is Anna Cornils.

Emblem 
On a yellow shield, a blue triangle below with slightly curved edges. Above right a green windmill, above left a green barn (a Treppenspeicher), in the centre a silver transmission tower.

Places of interest 
 The mill dating back to 1877/78 is a listed building. It was worked until 1975, from 1950 without sails.
 The transmission tower (Funkübertragungsstelle Bergen 1) replaced the old tower (built in 1952, demolished in 1996) in 1986

Literature 
 Hermann v.d. Kammer: Geschichte der Ortschaft Wardböhmen mit den Ortsteilen Hoope und Sehlhof. Bergen 1997

References

External links 
Information about Wardböhmen

Villages in Lower Saxony
Bergen, Lower Saxony
Lüneburg Heath
Celle (district)